Edward Storyn Darrah (October 1, 1892 – 1975) was a Canadian politician. He served in the Legislative Assembly of New Brunswick as member of the Liberal party from 1944 to 1952.

References

1892 births
1975 deaths
New Brunswick Liberal Association MLAs